The 1973 Troy State Trojans football team represented Troy State University (now known as Troy University) as a member of the Gulf South Conference (GSC) during the 1973 NCAA Division II football season. Led by second-year head coach Tom Jones, the Trojans compiled an overall record of 7–2–1 with a mark of 6–1 in conference play, winning the GSC title.

Schedule

References

Troy State
Troy Trojans football seasons
Gulf South Conference football champion seasons
Troy State Trojans football